Jordan Ray Smith (born July 5, 1990) is a bench coach for the Lake County Captains in the Cleveland Indians organization.

Career
Smith was born in Willmar, Minnesota and attended Willmar High School and St. Cloud State University. In 2011, he played collegiate summer baseball with the Yarmouth–Dennis Red Sox of the Cape Cod Baseball League, and was selected by the Cleveland Indians in the 9th round of the 2011 Major League Baseball Draft.

Smith began his professional career with a .300 batting average and .403 on-base percentage his first professional season and followed that with a .316 batting average in 2012. In 2013, he stole 18 bases and in 2014, he was selected to play in the Arizona Fall League with the Peoria Javelinas. He stole 18 bases in 2015 and 17 bases in 2016. He reached Triple A for the first time in 2016. Going into that year, he was ranked one of the Indians' top prospects. He was ranked even better going into 2012. He has been compared to Lonnie Chisenhall. He also played for Toros del Este in the Dominican Professional Baseball League.

On February 26, 2018, Smith signed with the St. Paul Saints of the American Association. He was waived on June 5, 2018, and claimed by the Sioux Falls Canaries.

On January 18, 2019, Smith's contract was sold to the Cleveland Indians.

Smith was a New York-Penn League Mid-Season All-Star in 2011 and a MiLB.com Organization All-Star in 2012 and 2013.

In December 2021, Smith returned to St. Cloud State University, graduating with a Bachelor of Elective Studies degree.

References

External links

Living people
1990 births
Baseball players from Minnesota
Baseball outfielders
St. Cloud State Huskies baseball players
Yarmouth–Dennis Red Sox players
Mahoning Valley Scrappers players
Lake County Captains players
Carolina Mudcats players
Akron RubberDucks players
Peoria Javelinas players
Columbus Clippers players
Toros del Este players
American expatriate baseball players in the Dominican Republic
St. Paul Saints players
Sioux Falls Canaries players